In algebraic topology, a branch of mathematics, the Čech-to-derived functor spectral sequence is a spectral sequence that relates Čech cohomology of a sheaf and sheaf cohomology.

Definition
Then the Čech-to-derived functor spectral sequence is:

Properties
If  consists of only two open sets, then this spectral sequence degenerates to the Mayer–Vietoris sequence.  See Spectral sequence#Long exact sequences.

If for all finite intersections of a covering the cohomology vanishes, the E2-term degenerates and the edge morphisms yield an isomorphism of Čech cohomology for this covering to sheaf cohomology. This provides a method of computing sheaf cohomology using Čech cohomology. This can be used to compute the cohomology of line bundles on projective space.

See also 
 Leray's theorem

Notes

References

 
 

Spectral sequences